Andrew Blitz (born June 28, 1971) is an American comedian, writer, producer and actor best known for his sketch comedy and writing work on the late-night talk show Late Night with Conan O'Brien. He has received nine Emmy Award nominations.

Early life and education
Blitz was born in New York City and grew up in Ridgewood, New Jersey, where he attended Ridgewood High School, graduating as part of the class of 1989. He graduated from Columbia University in 1994.

Career 
By 1999 he had established himself as a fixture of New York City's stand-up comedy scene, performing regularly at the now-defunct Luna Lounge; in that same year he began his work on Late Night. Since leaving Late Night, Blitz has worked as a writer, executive producer and guest actor on the Comedy Central series Review and worked as a writer and co-executive producer on the Netflix series Master of None. Blitz previously wrote for the Adult Swim series Eagleheart starring Chris Elliott, Maria Thayer and Brett Gelman. Blitz appeared in Season 4 of Arrested Development and the movie Table 19. He continues to perform stand-up comedy.

Blitz is the brother of filmmaker Jeffrey Blitz, who is best known for directing the 2002 documentary Spellbound and the 2007 film Rocket Science.

Late Night with Conan O'Brien characters
As himself, going apartment-hunting with Conan, and shortly thereafter with Conan helping to furnish his apartment. Blitz lugging his malfunctioning computer to a call center in Hyderabad, India. Blitz hailing a New York City yellow cab and taking it all the way to Toronto Canada due to his fear of flying.
Awful Sports Chanter
Chuck Aloo, of the parody series "60"
Leonard Diesel, Vin Diesel's timid brother. (Blitz later played a different character named Osama bin Diesel on the MTV sketch comedy series Human Giant.)
A member of the singing trio The Slipnutz
An elections supervisor during the 2000 Florida election recount, who constantly yelled at election volunteers and advised them, "If you don't know who the person voted for, you put the ballot in the milk!"
A participant on "Masturdate," a parody of dating shows.
A ghost rejected from the novel A Christmas Carol

Filmography

Acting

Film

Television

Writing

Television

See also
List of Late Night with Conan O'Brien sketches

References

External links

1971 births
Living people
American stand-up comedians
American male television actors
American television writers
American male television writers
Writers Guild of America Award winners
Comedians from New York City
Comedians from New Jersey
People from Ridgewood, New Jersey
Ridgewood High School (New Jersey) alumni
Screenwriters from New York (state)
Screenwriters from New Jersey
21st-century American comedians
21st-century American screenwriters
21st-century American male writers